NURFC may refer to:
National Underground Railroad Freedom Center
Northeastern University Rugby Football Club